Reclus (named after Élisée Reclus; sometimes confused with Cerro Mano del Diablo southwest of Reclus), also written as Reclús, is a volcano located in the Southern Patagonian Ice Field, Chile. Close to the volcano lies the Amalia Glacier, which is actively eroding Reclus.

The volcano has been active during the late Pleistocene and Holocene. This tephra fell out over a large area of Patagonia as far as Tierra del Fuego, and disrupted the ecosystem in the region. Subsequently, further but smaller eruptions occurred during the Pleistocene and Holocene. The last historical eruption was in 1908.

The volcano is remote and monitoring began only recently. Two dams are located close to the volcano and might be impacted by future eruptions.

Geography and geology

Regional 

This subduction process is responsible for volcanic activity in the Austral Volcanic Zone; south of the southernmost volcano of this zone, Fueguino, the subduction gives way to strike-slip faulting. This subduction process is not accompanied by much earthquake activity.

Not all volcanism at these latitudes was triggered by subduction; during the Miocene the Chile Rise was subducted here and this caused a temporary pause of the subduction process and the formation of a slab window. During this period, southern Patagonia was subject to extensive basaltic volcanism. Later subduction restarted and the Austral Volcanic Zone was born.

Farther north in Chile and Argentina, volcanism occurs as a consequence of the subduction of the Nazca Plate beneath the South America Plate, forming the Central Volcanic Zone in northern Chile and Argentina and the Southern Volcanic Zone in southern Chile and Argentina. These two volcanic zones are separated from each other and the Austral Volcanic Zone by gaps without recent volcanic activity.

Local 

Traces of glacial erosion are not widespread on the edifice, but a radial pattern of erosional gullys overlays the volcano. In 2019, a  landslide took place on its northeastern flank, which propagated below the Amalia Glacier. Lava and pyroclastics are its principal output.

The volcano rises within the cirque of the Amalia Glacier and the glacier is actively eroding Reclus; retreat of the glacier in the 1980s has exposed part of the volcano. Politically, the volcano lies in the commune of Natales.

The volcano was at first confused with Cerro Mano del Diablo, a mountain located southwest of Reclus proper and formed by sedimentary rocks; only in 1987 was the volcano's true location discovered. This volcano, like other volcanoes of the Austral Volcanic Zone, is not monitored and lies at considerable distance from human habitation. This remoteness of the volcanoes in the region and the frequently hostile weather conditions often make it difficult to identify volcanoes and their precise location.

Reclus is part of the Austral Volcanic Zone, a belt of volcanoes at the southernmost tip of South America which includes six volcanoes: from north to south, Lautaro, Viedma, Aguilera, Reclus, Monte Burney and Fueguino. These volcanoes are not very high, seldom exceeding . With the exception of the last they are all stratovolcanoes with glaciers and evidence of Holocene activity; Lautaro erupted in 1959. Activity in the Austral Volcanic Zone has resulted in the widespread deposition of tephra in southernmost South America. All of them have erupted exclusively andesite or dacite; basalts or basaltic andesite are absent in contrast to the Southern Volcanic Zone farther north. These rocks in the case of the Austral Volcanic Zone are all of adakitic character, but there does not appear to be an unifying reason for this chemistry among the various volcanoes.

Aguilera, Reclus and Burney are constructed along the eastern margin of the Patagonian Batholith. Metamorphic and sedimentary rocks of Paleozoic-Mesozoic age are also part of the basement. The terrain surrounding Reclus is formed by the volcanic-sedimentary El Quemado and Zapata formations.

Petrology 

The groundmass of Reclus rocks is compositionally dacite to rhyolite, and contains phenocrysts of amphibole, hornblende, orthopyroxene and plagioclase. Plagioclase and quartz also form xenocrysts. The magmas of Reclus appear to form from slab melts that interacted with the mantle.

Eruptive history 

Reclus together with Aguilera, Hudson and Monte Burney has been a major source of tephra for the region of Tierra del Fuego and Patagonia. Tephra layers discovered in Laguna Potrok Aike and dated to 63,200 years ago and 44,000–51,000 years ago may come from Reclus. However, the potassium content of the later tephra seems to correlate more with Lautaro or Viedma. In general, distinguishing Reclus tephras from these of Aguilera, Lautaro or Viedma is difficult.

R1 eruption 

A large eruption, called "R1", occurred at the end of the Last Glacial Maximum at Reclus. It was dated by radiocarbon dating to have occurred 12,640 ± 260 radiocarbon years ago.

The R1 tephra, originally identified in Patagonia as "Tephra A", was deposited at various sites in southernmost Chile and Argentina such as Bahía Inutil, Brunswick Peninsula, Cardiel Lake, Dawson Island, East Falkland, Estrecho de Magellanes, Fitzroy Channel, Muñoz Gamero Peninsula, Laguna Potrok Aike, Puerto del Hambre, Río Rubens in Patagonia, Seno Otway, Seno Skyring, Tierra del Fuego and in the Última Esperanza Province. Some of these deposits were formed by tephra that originally fell onto glaciers and was later transported to the eventual finding sites. The tephra emission from this and later eruptions surely disrupted the local ecosystem and human habitations in the region as far south as Tierra del Fuego, possibly causing the extinction of a regional vicuña population in Patagonia.

The composition of the tephra varies between different outcrops; outcrops in Tierra del Fuego lack biotite unlike closer deposits. These deposits have been used as stratigraphic and chronological markers for events at the end of the last glaciation in the region. Ice cores taken at Taylor Dome in Antarctica display a spike in  about 16,000 years ago, which may have originated at Reclus.

Late Pleistocene and Holocene 

Soon after the R1 eruption, an eruption 15,700 years ago deposited the first post-glacial Reclus tephra into Laguna Potrok Aike. 12,000 years before present, a large eruption occurred at Reclus and deposited ash over the Grey Glacier and Tyndal Glacier of the Southern Patagonian Ice Shield. Ash fell as far as the Estrecho de Magallanes, including the area of Bahia Inutil, Dawson Island and Punta Arenas. The date of the eruption has been constrained with radiocarbon dating to 12,010 ± 55 years before present.

A set of tephras discovered at Torres del Paine, Nordenskjöld Lake and other locations in Patagonia and emplaced between 8,270 ± 90 and 9,435 ± 40 radiocarbon years ago may have originated in minor eruptions of Reclus. One of these eruptions, at 9,180 ± 120 radiocarbon years ago, might have deposited ash as far as Tierra del Fuego.

A 3,780 years old peat has been covered by tephra at least six times. Eruptions have also been inferred from tephra deposits elsewhere:
 12,480 years before present also and deposited ash in Tierra del Fuego. 
 10,430 years before present, found in Torres del Paine.
 9,624 years before present, found in Torres del Paine. 
 A tephra with an age of 10,600–10,200 also comes from Reclus and originated in an eruption smaller than the R1 event. 
 A tephra dated to 2,000 years before present in Torres del Paine have been attributed to Reclus. The tephra has been found in Lago Guanaco, Lago Margarita and Vega Nandú.
 A tephra dated 1,789 radiocarbon years ago in Lago Guanaco, Torres del Paine. Much less extensive than R1, it has been called "R2 tephra".
 Another tephra dated 1,035 radiocarbon years ago in Lago Guanaco, Torres del Paine. Also much less extensive than R1, it has been called "R3 tephra".
 Finally, a tephra in Lake Arthuro of Santa Inés Island appears to come from an eruption at Reclus 1,040 years before present.
 In 2019, the occurrence of a 1458 AD eruption was proposed to explain the presence of sulfate deposits in Antarctic ice cores that were previously attributed to Kuwae.

A tephra identified in an ice core at Talos Dome, Antarctica, and emplaced there 3,390 years before present is compositionally similar to Reclus products. However, there is little evidence for large eruptions at Reclus during the late Holocene and the Puyehue-Cordón Caulle volcano in the Southern Volcanic Zone has been proposed as a source for this tephra.

Historical activity 

In 1879, sailors on  observed a volcanic eruption in an icefield and named the volcano Reclus after Élisée Reclus, but the Global Volcanism Program indicates that an earlier eruption occurred in 1869. The volcano first appeared in the 1922 edition of the map West Coast of South América from Magellan Strait to Valparaíso. Legends of the Tehuelche people about "black smoke" in the region could also refer to volcanic activity at Reclus.

The last recorded eruption of Reclus was in 1908, but local press reports in the 1980s and 1990s attributed earthquakes to volcanic activity at Reclus and Burney. Seismic activity was noted at Reclus in 1998 and 2003, and possible eruption phenomena were reported in 2008 in form of tephra deposition and cracks in the glaciers. In 2015, the Chilean SERNAGEOMIN announced that they would install an experimental surveillance system at Reclus and in 2020 it was classified as a "type III" volcano, meaning a high-hazard volcano. Ash from a future eruption of Reclus could be swept into the reservoirs of Néstor Kirchner Dam and Jorge Cepernic Dam on the Santa Cruz River, impacting their activity.

See also

 List of volcanoes in Chile

Notes

References

Sources

External links 
 Climbing history

Volcanoes of Magallanes Region
Andean Volcanic Belt
Active volcanoes
Cinder cones of Chile
Mountains of Chile
Quaternary volcanoes
Quaternary South America
Polygenetic cinder cones